EDB may refer to:

Organizations:
 Economic Development Board of the Government of Singapore
 Economic Development Board (South Australia)
 EDB Business Partner, a Norwegian IT services company
 Education Bureau, a policy bureau in Hong Kong
 Electricity Distribution Business
 EnterpriseDB, an American software company
 Entschädigungseinrichtung deutscher Banken
 Eurasian Development Bank, a regional development bank created by Russia and Kazakhstan

Other:
 Edinburgh Waverley railway station, in Scotland
 Electrodynamic bearing
 Energy Science and Technology Database, maintained by the United States Department of Energy
 Estradiol dibenzoate, an estrogen ester
 Ethylene dibromide
 Extensor digitorum brevis muscle
 External data bus: The primary data highway of all computers. Everything in a computer is tied either directly or indirectly to the external data bus.

See also 

 Economic Development Board (disambiguation)